Rafflesia manillana is a parasitic plant species of the genus Rafflesia. It is endemic to the Philippines.

This species was named after the city of Manila. The most recent discussion of the taxonomy of this species can be found in this citation 

Rafflesia panchoana, described in 2007, is considered a heterotypic synonym of R. manillana.

References

External links
 Parasitic Plant Connection: Rafflesia manillana page

manillana
Endemic flora of the Philippines
Flora of Luzon